Maria Sansaridou (born March 31, 1977, Thessaloniki) is a retired Greek rhythmic gymnast.

She competed for Greece in the rhythmic gymnastics all-around competition at the 1992 Summer Olympics in Barcelona. She was 10th in the qualification round and advanced to the final, placing 11th overall.

References

External links 
 

1977 births
Living people
Greek rhythmic gymnasts
Gymnasts at the 1992 Summer Olympics
Olympic gymnasts of Greece
Gymnasts from Thessaloniki